A basement is one or more floors of a building that are either completely or partially below the ground floor. 

Basement or The Basement may also refer to:

Film and TV
 Basement (2010 film), a British horror film
 Basement (2014 film), a Filipino horror film
The Basement (film), a 2017 American horror film

Music
 Basement (band), a British emo band from Ipswich 
 "Basement", a song by Puddle Of Mudd from Come Clean
 "Basement", a 2018 track by Toby Fox from Deltarune Chapter 1 OST from the video game Deltarune
 "The Basement", a song by Pete Rock & CL Smooth from their 1992 album Mecca and the Soul Brother

Other uses 
Basement (geology), rock that lies below sedimentary rocks
The Basement, former name of a theatre venue within the Metro Arts Theatre
The Basement (play), a 1967 television play by Harold Pinter
The Basement: Meditations on a Human Sacrifice, a 1979 book by Kate Millett

See also
 
 
 Basement 5, a British reggae punk fusion band from London
In the Basement (film), a 2014 Austrian documentary film